This article lists agricultural universities and colleges around the world, by continent and country.

Africa

Algeria
Higher National Agronomic School (French name: Ecole Nationale Supérieure Agronomique)

Benin
 Agricultural University of Ketou (French name: Université Agricole de Kétou)
 Faculty of Agronomic Sciences (French name: Faculté des Sciences Agronomiques)

Cameroon
Université des Montagnes, Department of Agriculture and Veterinary Medicine (Agro-Vet)
University of Buea, Faculty of Agriculture and Veterinary Medicine
University of Dschang, Faculty of Agriculture and Agricultural Sciences 
University of Maroua, Higher institute of the sahel (ISS), Department of Agriculture, Livestock and Agricultural derived products

Democratic Republic of Congo
Institut Facultaire des Sciences Agronomiques de Yangambi (IFA/Yangambi)

Egypt
 Faculty of Agriculture, Alexandria University
 Faculty of Agriculture, Ain Shams University
 Faculty of Agriculture, Suez Canal University
 Faculty of Agriculture, Al-Azhar University
 Faculty of Agriculture, Assiut University
 Faculty of Agriculture, Aswan University
 Faculty of Agriculture, Beniswaif University
 Faculty of Agriculture, Benha University
 Faculty of Agriculture, Cairo University
 Faculty of Agriculture, Damanhour University
 Faculty of Agriculture, Damietta University
 Faculty of Agriculture, Fayoum University
 Faculty of Agriculture, Kafrelsheikh University
 Faculty of Agriculture, Mansoura University
 Faculty of Agriculture, Minia University
 Faculty of Agriculture, Monofia University
 Faculty of Agriculture, Sohag University
 Faculty of Agriculture, South Valley University
 Faculty of Agriculture, Tanta University
 Faculty of Agriculture, Zagazig University
 Faculty of Organic Agriculture, Heliopolies University

Ethiopia 
 Arba Minch University
 Aksum University
 College of Agriculture and Environmental Sciences – Bahir Dar University
 College of Agriculture and Veterinary Medicine, Jimma University
 Debre Berhan University, College of Agriculture and Natural Resources Sciences
 Debre Markos University College of Agriculture and Natural Resources
 Gewane Agricultural College
 Haramaya University
 Hawassa University
 Wondo Genet College of Forestry and Natural Resources
 Mekelle University
 Raya University
 Wolaita Sodo University

Ghana
College of Agriculture (University of Education Winneba) Mampong
College of Agriculture and Consumer Sciences, University of Ghana
College of Agriculture and Natural Resources, Kwame Nkrumah University of Science and Technology
Faculty of Agribusiness and Communication Sciences (University for Development Studies) Tamale
school of Agriculture, University of Cape Coast
Faculty of Agriculture, University for Development Studies
Department of Agribusiness Management and Finance (University for Development Studies) Tamale
Kwadaso Agricultural College, Kumasi (Agricultural University of Ghana)
University of Energy and Natural Resource, Sunyani

Kenya 
 Faculty of Agriculture, University of Nairobi
 Egerton University
 Jomo Kenyatta University of Agriculture and Technology
 Pwani University, School of Agricultural Sciences and Agribusiness
 Kenyatta University[ School of Agriculture and Enterprise Development]

Malawi 
 Lilongwe University of Agriculture and Natural Resources-Bunda College Campus
 Lilongwe University of Agriculture and Natural Resources-Natural Resources College campus

Niger 
 Faculty of Agronomy of Niamey (French name: Faculté d'Agronomie de Niamey)

Nigeria 
• Faculty of Agriculture, University of Abuja, Abuja.

 Faculty of Agriculture Science, Ebonyi State University(EBSU)
 University of Ilorin, Ilorin, Kwara State 
 Landmark University, Omu - Aran www.lmu.edu.ng, Kwara state
 Audu Bako School of Agriculture, Dambatta, Kano State
 Ahmadu Bello University, Zaria, Kaduna State
 Bauchi State College of Agriculture
 Federal College of Animal Health and Production Technology, Moor Plantation Ibadan
 Federal College of Agricultural Produce Technology, Kano
 Offer Center Institute of Agriculture,Iwo
 Federal College of Agriculture, Ibadan
 Federal College of Agriculture, Akure, Ondo State
 Federal College of Agriculture, Ishiagu
 Federal College of Forestry, Jos, Plateau State
 Federal College of Animal Health and Production Technology, Vom
 Federal University of Technology Owerri
 Kwara State University, Ilorin
 Ladoke Akintola University of Technology, Ogbomosho
 Michael Okpara University of Agriculture, Umudike
 Modibbo Adama University of Technology, Yola
 Obafemi Awolowo University, Ile-Ife
 The Polytechnic, Ibadan
 University of Agriculture, Abeokuta
 University of Agriculture, Makurdi
 University of Ibadan, Ibadan
 University of Nigeria, Nsukka
 Federal University of Technology, Owerri
 Federal University of Technology, Akure
 Federal University of Technology, Minna

Sierra Leone 
Njala University
University of Sierra Leone
University of Makeni (UNIMAK)

Somalia 
 Zamzam University of Science and Technology, Faculty of Agriculture 
 Baidoa international university
 Benadir University

South Africa 

Free State University, Faculty of Natural and Agricultural Sciences
 Stellenbosch University, Faculty of AgriSciences
 Elsenburg Agricultural Training College , Western Cape Government, Department of Agriculture
 Nelson Mandela Metropolitan University, Department of Agriculture
 University of Fort Hare, Faculty of Science and Agriculture
 University of Pretoria, Faculty of Natural and Agricultural Sciences
 Fort Cox College of Agriculture and Forestry, faculties of Agriculture and Forestry
 Cape Peninsula University of Technology, Department of Applied Sciences
 Majuba College, Nelspruit, Department of Agriculture
 North-West University, Department of Agriculture.
 Cedara Agricultural College  Kwazulu Natal Government, Department of Agriculture
 TompiSeleka College of Agriculture, in Limpopo Province
 Madzivhandila College of Agriculture, in Limpopo Province
 Glen College of Agriculture, in Free State Province
 Tsolo College of Agriculture, in Eastern Cape Province
 Taung College of Agriculture, in North West Province
 Potchefstroom College of Agriculture, in North West Province
 Owen Sithole College of Agriculture, in Kwazulu Natal Province
 Grootfontein College of Agriculture, in Western Cape Province
 Lowveld College of Agriculture, in Mpumalanga Province
 University of Limpopo, Faculty of Environmental Sciences and Agriculture.

Sudan 
 Faculty of Agriculture, University of Khartoum
sudan university of science and technology college of agricultural studies
 Agricultural Technology – Elneelin University
 Faculty of Agriculture, Gezira University 
 faculty of agricultural, kassala university 
 Faculty of Animal Production, Gazira University
 Faculty of Agriculture, University of Zalingei
 faculty of agriculture,  sinnar university
 Faculty of Agriculture, University of Gadarif

Tanzania 
 Sokoine University of Agriculture

Togo
 School of Agronomy of the University of Lome ('French name: Ecole Supérieure d'Agronomie de l'Université de Lomé)

Tunisia
 Institut Supérieur Agronomique de Chott Mériem
 Institut National Agronomique de Tunisie
 Institut Supérieur Agronomique de Mograne
 Ecole Supérieure d'Agriculture Mateur
 Ecole Supérieure d'Agriculture du Kef

Uganda 
 Bukalasa Agricultural College
 Makerere University
 Gulu University Faculty of Agriculture and Environment
 Kentim University Uganda Project – Department of Agriculture
 Kyambogo University
 Eastern Polytechnic 
 Uganda Christian University
   Nkumba University
 Bishop Stuart University
 Kitgum Agriculture and Vocational Institute (KAVI)
 Mbarara University of Science & Technology
 Ndejje University

Zambia 
 University of Zambia
 Natural Resources Development College
 Copperbelt University
 Zambia College of Agriculture, Monze
 Zambia College of Agriculture, Mpika
 knsit University

Zimbabwe 
 University of Zimbabwe
 Midlands State University
 Chinhoyi University of Technology// Faculty of Agriculture and Environmental Science//Bindura University of Science Education
 
 Lupane State University
 Esigodini College of Agriculture
 Mlezu College of Agriculture
 Rio Tinto College of Agriculture 
 Chibero College of Agriculture 
 Kushinga Pikelela College of Agriculture
 Mazowe Veterinary College

Asia

Afghanistan 
 Balkh University
 Bamyan University
 Herat University
 Kabul University
 Al-Beroni University
 Kandahar University
 Nangarhar University
 Paktia University
 Shaikh Zayed University
 Takhar University
 Shaikh Zayed University, Khost
 Baghlan University

Azerbaijan 

 Azerbaijan State Agricultural University

Bangladesh 

Government or public
 Bangladesh Agricultural University
 Sher-e-Bangla Agricultural University
 Bangabandhu Sheikh Mujibur Rahman Agricultural University 
 Sylhet Agricultural University
 Khulna Agricultural University
 Patuakhali Science and Technology University (Faculty of Agriculture)
 Noakhali Science and Technology University (Department of Agriculture, Department of Fisheries and Marine Science)
 Hajee Mohammad Danesh Science and Technology University (Faculty of Agriculture)
 Khulna University (Agrotechnology Discipline)
 Rajshahi University (Faculty of Agriculture)
 Bangabandhu Sheikh Mujibur Rahman Science and Technology University (Faculty of Agriculture)

Private
 International University of Business, Agriculture and Technology
 EXIM Bank Agricultural University
 First Capital University (Faculty of Agriculture)
 Ishakha International University (Faculty of Agriculture)
 Atish Dipankar University of Science and Technology

Cambodia 
 Prek Leap National Institute of Agriculture

China 
 Anhui Agricultural University
 China Agricultural University, Beijing
 Fujian Agriculture and Forestry University
 Gansu Agricultural University
 Huazhong Agricultural University
 Hunan Agricultural University
 Hebei Agricultural University
 Henan Agricultural University
 Inner Mongolia Agricultural University
 Jiangxi Agricultural University
 Nanjing Agricultural University
 Northeast Agricultural University
 Northwest Agriculture and Forestry University
 Qingdao Agricultural University
 Shandong Agricultural University
 Shanxi Agricultural University
 Shenyang Agricultural University
 Sichuan Agricultural University
 South China Agricultural University
 Tianjin Agricultural University
 Xinjiang Agricultural University
 Yunnan Agricultural University
 Zhejiang A & F University

India 

 Acharya N. G. Ranga Agricultural University, Hyderabad
 Aligarh Muslim University, Aligarh
 Anand Agricultural University, Anand, Gujarat
 Annamalai University, Chidambaram, Tamil Nadu, India
 Assam Agricultural University, Jorhat
 Banaras Hindu University, Varanasi
 Bihar Agricultural University, Bhagalpur
 Bidhan Chandra Krishi Viswavidyalaya, West Bengal
 Birsa Agricultural University, Kanke, RanchiJharkhand
 Central Institute of Fisheries Education, Mumbai
 Central Institute of Fisheries Technology, Kochi, Kerala
 Central Agricultural University, Imphal
 Chandra Shekhar Azad University of Agriculture and Technology, Kanpur
 Chaudhary Charan Singh Haryana Agricultural University, Hisar
 Chaudhary Sarwan Kumar Himachal Pradesh Krishi Vishvavidyalaya, Palampur
 College of Agricultural Technology, Theni
 Dr. Y.S.R. Horticultural University, Venkataramannagudem, West Godavari, Andhra Pradesh
 Dr. Balasaheb Sawant Konkan Krishi Vidyapeeth, Dapoli
 Dr. Panjabrao Deshmukh Krishi Vidyapeeth, Akola
 Dr. Yashwant Singh Parmar University of Horticulture and Forestry, Solan
 DAV University, Jalandhar
Dev Bhoomi Group of Institutions
 GIET University, Gunupur, Odisha
 G. B. Pant University of Agriculture and Technology, Pantnagar
 Guru Angad Dev Veterinary and Animal Sciences University, Ludhiana
 Himalayan Institute of Technology, Dehradun
 Indian Agricultural Research Institute, New Delhi
 Indira Gandhi Agricultural University, Raipur
 Indian Veterinary Research Institute, Bareilly
 Jawaharlal Nehru Agricultural University, Jabalpur
 Junagadh Agricultural University, Junagadh
 Kerala Agricultural University, Vellanikkara, Thrissur
 Kerala University of Fisheries and Ocean Studies, Kochi
 Kerala Veterinary and Animal Sciences University, Wayanad
 Karnataka Veterinary, Animal and Fisheries Sciences University, Bidar
 Krishna College of Agriculture and Technology (KRISAT), Madurai
 Lala Lajpat Rai University of Veterinary and Animal Sciences, Hisar
 Lovely Professional University, Phagwara
 Quantum University, Dehradun
 Maharashtra Animal and Fishery Sciences University
 Mahatma Phule Krishi Vidyapeeth, Rahuri
 Marathwada Agricultural University, Parbhani
 Maharana Pratap University of Agriculture and Technology, Udaipur
 Manyawar Shri Kanshiram Ji University of Agriculture and Technology
 Nagaland University
 Narendra Dev University of Agriculture and Technology, Faizabad
 National Dairy Research Institute, Karnal
 Navsari Agricultural University, Navsari
 Orissa University of Agriculture and Technology, Bhubaneswar
 Professor Jayashankar Telangana State Agricultural University, Rajendranagar, Hyderabad
 Punjab Agricultural University, Ludhiana
 Rajendra Agricultural University, Samastipur
 RNB Global University, Bikaner
 Chandigarh University
 Sam Higginbottom University of Agriculture, Technology and Sciences
 Sher-e-Kashmir University of Agricultural Sciences and Technology of Jammu
 Sher-e-Kashmir University of Agricultural Sciences and Technology of Kashmir, Srinagar
 Sri Konda Laxman Telangana State Horticultural University, Hyderabad
 Swami Keshwanand Rajasthan Agricultural University, Bikaner
 Tamil Nadu Agricultural University, Coimbatore, Tamil Nadu, India
 Tamil Nadu Veterinary and Animal Sciences University, Madhavaram, Chennai, India
 Tamil Nadu Fisheries University, Nagapattinam, Tamil Nadu, India
 Tilka Manjhi Agriculture College, Godda, Jharkhand, India
 Sardarkrushinagar Dantiwada Agricultural University, Banaskantha
 Sardar Vallabhbhai Patel University of Agriculture and Technology, Meerut
 Sam Higginbottom Institute of Agriculture, Technology and Sciences, Allahabad
 Baba Saheb Dr. B.R.A. College of Agriculture Engineering & Technology, Etawah
 University of Agricultural Sciences, Bangalore
 University of Agricultural Sciences, Dharwad
 University of Agricultural Sciences, Raichur
 University of Horticultural Sciences, Bagalkot
 University of Agricultural and Horticultural Sciences, Shimoga
 Uttar Pradesh Pandit Deen Dayal Upadhyaya Pashu Chikitsa Vigyan Vishwavidyalaya Evam Go Anusandhan Sansthan, Mathura
 Uttarakhand University of Horticulture and Forestry
 Uttar Banga Krishi Viswavidyalaya, Cooch Behar
 Visva-Bharati University, Santiniketan
 West Bengal University of Animal and Fishery Sciences, Kolkata

See also
 Agricultural Universities (India)
 List of forestry universities and colleges
 List of universities in India

Indonesia 

As an agricultural country, Indonesia has a lot of public and private agricultural education institutions. They consist of universities, polytechnics, and colleges.

 Bogor Agricultural University, Bogor
 University of Brawijaya, Malang
 Gadjah Mada University, Yogyakarta
 Padjadjaran University, Sumedang
 University of Muhammadiyah Yogyakarta, Yogyakarta
 Udayana University, Bali
 University of Sumatera Utara, Medan
 School of Life Sciences and Technology, Bandung Institute of Technology, Bandung
 Syiah Kuala University, Banda Aceh
 University of Jember, Jember

Iran 
 Faculty of Agriculture, Bu Ali Sina University of Hamedan
 College of Agriculture, University of Jiroft
 Gorgan University of Agricultural Sciences and Natural Resources
 Eghlid University of Agricultural Sciences
 Islamic Azad University of Qaemshahr
 Islamic Azad University of Shabestar
Sari Agricultural Sciences and Natural Resources University
 Faculty of Agricultural Sciences & Natural Resources, Arak University, Arak University
 Faculty of Agriculture, Ferdowsi University of Mashhad 
 Gonbad Kavous University* Faculty of Agriculture, Guilan University
 College of Agriculture, Isfahan University of Technology
 Islamic Azad University
 Faculty of Agriculture, Azadshahr Branch
 Faculty of Agriculture, Isfahan Branch Khorasgan
 Faculty of Agriculture, Karaj Branch
 Faculty of Agriculture, Roudehen Branch
 Faculty of Agriculture, Science and Research Branch
 Faculty of Agriculture, Varamin Branch
 Khouzesatn-Ramin Agricultural and Natural Resources University
 College of Agriculture, Shahed University
 Faculty of Agriculture, Shiraz University
 Faculty of Agriculture, University of Kurdistan
 University of Tabriz
 Faculty of Agriculture, Tarbiat Modares University
 University of Tehran
 College of Abureyhan
 Karaj College of Agriculture and Natural Resources* Faculty of Agriculture, University of Zanjan
 Faculty of Agriculture, Urmia University
 َAgricultural Research Institute, Iranian Research Organization for Science & Technology

Iraq 
 Technical College Al-Musaib, Al-furat Al-Awast Technical University
 Faculty of Agriculture, University of Babylon
 Faculty of Agriculture, University of Baghdad
 Faculty of Agriculture, University of Basra
 Faculty of Agriculture, University of Mosul
 Faculty of Agriculture, University of Kwofa
 Faculty of Agriculture, University of Thi-Gar
 Faculty of Agriculture, University of Maissan
 Faculty of Agriculture, University of Waset
 Faculty of Agriculture, University of Anbar
 Faculty of Agriculture, University of Dyalla
 Faculty of Agriculture, University of Karbala 
 Faculty of Agriculture, University of Aldewania
 Faculty of Agriculture, University of Salah Aldean
 Faculty of Agriculture, University of Alswlaimania
 Faculty of Agriculture, University of Arbil
 Faculty of Agriculture, University of Dhowk
Faculty of Agriculture, University of Tehran

Israel 

 Robert H. Smith Faculty of Agriculture, Food and Environment, Hebrew University of Jerusalem

Japan 

National and public
 Akita Prefectural University (Science biological resources)
 Chiba University (Faculty of Horticulture)
 Ehime University
 Fukui Prefectural University (Faculty of Bioresources)
 Gifu University (part of Applied Biological Sciences)
 Hirosaki University (Faculty of Agriculture and Life Sciences)
 Hiroshima University (Faculty of Biological productivity)
 Hokkaido University
 Ibaraki University
 Ishikawa Prefectural University (Faculty of Biological Resources and Environment)
 Iwate University
 Kagawa University
 Kagoshima University
 Kobe University
 Kochi University
 Kyoto Prefectural University (Faculty of Life and Environmental)
 Kyoto University
 Kyushu University
 Mie University (Faculty of Bioresources)
 Miyagi University (School of food industry)
 Nagoya University
 Niigata University
 Obihiro University of Agriculture and Veterinary Medicine (Faculty of Animal Husbandry)
 Okayama University
 Osaka Prefectural University (range of Life and Environmental Sciences)
 Prefectural University of Hiroshima (Faculty of Life and Environmental)
 Prefectural University of Kumamoto (Faculty of Symbiotic)
 Saga University
 Shimane University (Faculty of Bioresources)
 Shinshu University
 Shizuoka University
 Tohoku University
 Tokyo University of Agriculture and Technology
 Tottori University
 University of Miyazaki
 University of Shiga Prefecture (Faculty of Environmental Sciences)
 University of the Ryukyus
 University of Tokyo
 University of Tsukuba (College of Life and Environmental Sciences group biological resources)
 University of Yamanashi (Faculty of Life and Environmental)
 Utsunomiya University
 Yamagata University
 Yamaguchi University

Private
 Chubu University (Faculty of Applied Biological)
 Kinki University
 Kyoto Gakuen University (Faculty of Environmental Biotechnology)
 Meiji University
 Meijo University
 Minami Kyushu University (Faculty of Health and Nutrition, Faculty of Environmental Horticulture)
 Nagahama Institute of Bio-Science and Technology (Faculty of Biosciences)
 Nihon University (part Bioresource Science)
 Nippon Veterinary and Life Science University (Applied Life Sciences)
 Okayama University of Science (scheduled to open in April 2012, Faculty of Earth organisms)
 Rakuno Gakuen University (Agriculture food group Environmental Studies)
 Ryukoku University (scheduled to open in April 2015)
 Tamagawa University
 Tokai University
 Tokyo University of Agriculture (Faculty of Biology, Faculty of Industry and Food Sciences and International Environmental and Regional Applied Biological Sciences section)

Malaysia 
 University College of Agroscience Malaysia
 Universiti Malaysia Kelantan
 Universiti Putra Malaysia
 Universiti Malaysia Sabah
 Universiti Malaysia Terengganu
 Universiti Sultan Zainal Abidin
 Universiti Teknologi MARA Faculty of Plantation and Agrotechnology
 Universiti Tunku Abdul Rahman Faculty of Science

Myanmar 
Yezin Agricultural University
Advanced Center for Agricultural Research and Education, Yezin, Naypyitaw
State Agriculture Institute (Pyinmana)
State Agriculture Institute (Shwebo)
State Agriculture Institute (Myaungmya)
State Agriculture Institute (Tharyarwaddy)

Nepal 
Institute of Agriculture and Animal Sciences (IAAS), Tribhuvan University, Kathmandu
Institute of Agriculture and Animal Sciences, Tribhuvan University, Lamjung campus, Sundarbazar, Lamjung
Institute of Agriculture and Animal Sciences, Tribhuvan University, Paklihawa
Institute of Agriculture and Animal Sciences, Tribhuvan University, Gauradaha Agriculture Campus, Jhapa
Institute of Agriculture and Animal Sciences, Tribhuvan University, Khairahani Agriculture Campus, Chitwan
Mahendra Ratna Multiple Campus, Ilam  (IAAS/Tribhuvan University), B.Sc. Horticulture
Gokuleshwor Agriculture & Animal Science College (GAASC), Baitadi
Prithu Technical College, Dang
Mid west academy and research and research institute, college of live science, Dang
Agriculture and Forestry University]], Chitwan
CNRM, Puranchaur, Kaski
CNRM, Pakhribas
CNRM, Tikapur
CNRM, Sindhuli
Purbanchal University
GP Koirala College of Agriculture & Research Center (GPCAR), Gothgaun, Morang
Nepal Polytechnic Institute Bharatpur-11 Bhojod, Chitwan
Himalayan College of Agricultural Sciences & Technology (HICAST)

North Korea 
 Pyongyang University of Science and Technology, Pyongyang
 Chongjin University of Agriculture, Chongjin, North Hamgyeong Province
 Hyesan University of Agriculture, Hyesan, Ryanggang Province
 Kanggye University of Agriculture, Kanggye, Jagang Province
 Hamhung University of Agriculture, Hamhung, South Hamgyeong Province
 Nampo University of Agriculture, Nampo, South Pyongan Province
 Nampo University of Fisheries, Nampo, South Pyongan Province
 Kim Je Won University of Agriculture, Haeju, South Hwanghae Province
 Sinuiju University of Agriculture, Sinuiju, North Pyongan Province 
 Wonsan University of Agriculture, Wonsan, Kangwon Province

Pakistan 
 Sindh Agriculture University, Tando Jam
 Shaheed Benazir Bhutto University of Veterinary Animal Sciences, Sakrand
 Muhammad Nawaz Shareef University of Agriculture (MNSUA), Multan, Punjab
 Adnan khan shahbazkhail university of Agriculture, Fatehpur,(Layyah)Punjab
 University of Agriculture, Faisalabad (UAF)
 Faculty of Agriculture Gomal university, Dera Ismaeel Khan, Khyber Pakhtoon Khwa
 Faculty of Agriculture Sciences and Technology, Bahauddin Zakariya University, Multan
 Balochistan Agriculture College, Quetta
 Faculty of Agriculture, Gomal University
 Faculty of Agriculture and Environmental sciences, Islamia University, Bahawalpur
 University of Agriculture, Peshawar
 Lasbela University of Agriculture, Water and Marine Sciences, Othal, Lasbela District
 Pir Mehr Ali Shah, Arid Agriculture University, Rawalpindi, Punjab
 University College of Agriculture, Rawalakot
 Dera Ghazi Khan College of Agriculture,(CADGK) University of Agriculture, Faisalabad
 Department of Agriculture and Agribusiness Management, University of Karachi, Karachi
 University of Poonch Rawalakot, Azad Kashmir
 University College of Agriculture, University of Sargodha
 Institute of Agricultural Sciences, University of the Punjab, Lahore
 Zulfikar Ali Bhutto Agriculture College, Dokri
 Department of Environmental Sciences, COMSATS Institute of Information Technology, Vehari, Pakistan
 Zawar Ameer Bux Jamali Agriculture University
 University of Haripur, Haripur, KPK.
 Balochistan Agriculture College, Quetta
 University College Of Agriculture, University Of Sargodha
 Department of Agriculture, Abdul Wali Khan University Mardan

Philippines 
Ilocos Sur Polytechnic State College
 Benguet State University
 Pampanga Agricultural College
 Cebu Technological University
 Central Bicol State University of Agriculture
 Central Mindanao University
 Central Luzon State University Muñoz, Nueva Ecija
 De La Salle Araneta University
 Negros State College of Agriculture
 Romblon State University
 Tarlac College of Agriculture
 University of the Philippines Los Baños
 University of the Philippines Mindanao
 West Visayas State University-College of Agriculture and Forestry
 Visayas State University
 University of Southern Mindanao
 Xavier University, Ateneo de Cagayan
 Cagayan State University Gonzaga, Cagayan
 Aklan State University Banga, Aklan
 Bicol University College of Agriculture and Forestry
 University of Southeastern Philippines
 Bulacan Agricultural State College
 Southern Luzon State University
 University of Southeastern Philippines Tagum-Mabini Campus

Saudi Arabia 
 King Saud University
 Agricultural and Food Sciences-King Faisal University
 Qassim University
 College of Food and Environment Technology in Buraydah

South Korea 
 Korea National University of Agriculture and Fisheries
 Seoul National University, 
 Kyungpook National University, 
 Chonnam National University
 Chungnam National University
 Chonbuk National University
 Chungbuk National University
 Kangwon National University
 Gyeongsang National University
 Jeju National University

Sri Lanka 
 Eastern University of Sri Lanka, ( Faculty of Agriculture)
 Open University of Sri Lanka, Faculty of Engineering Technology.
 Rajarata University, Faculty of Agriculture
 Sabaragamuwa University of Sri Lanka
 University of Colombo, Institute of Agro Technology and Rural Science
 University of Jaffna, Faculty of Agriculture
 University of Peradeniya, Faculty of Agriculture
 University of Ruhuna, Faculty of Agriculture
 Uva-Wellassa University
 Wayamba University, Faculty of Agriculture and Plantation Management

Taiwan 
Public universities
 National Taiwan University
 National Chung Hsing University
 National Chiayi University
 National Pingtung University of Science and Technology
 National Ilan University

Private universities
 MingDao University

Thailand 

Public universities
Kasetsart University, Bangkok and Kamphaeng Saen 
Maejo University, Chiang Mai, Phrae and Chumphon
Chiang Mai University, Chiang Mai
Khon Kaen University, Khon Kaen
Prince of Songkla University, Songkla and Surat Thani
King Mongkut's Institute of Technology Ladkrabang, Bangkok and Chumphon
Ubon Ratchathani University, Ubon Ratchathani
Naresuan University, Phitsanulok
Silpakorn University, Phetchaburi
Suranaree University of Technology, Nakhon Ratchasima
Walailak University, Nakhon Si Thammarat
Thammasat University, faculty of science and technology, Pathum Thani
Mahidol University, faculty of science, Kanchanaburi
Chulalongkorn University, School of Agricultural Resources, Bangkok

Private universities
Rangsit University, College of Agricultural Innovation, Pathum Thani

International institutes
Asian Institute of Technology, School of Environment, Resources and Development, Pathum Thani

Turkmenistan 
 Turkmen Agricultural Institute

United Arab Emirates 
 College of Food and Agriculture, United Arab Emirates University

Vietnam 
 Hanoi University of Agriculture
 Ho Chi Minh City University of Agriculture and Sylviculture (Nông Lâm University)
 Can Tho University
 Hue University of Agriculture and Forestry (HUAF), Hue University
 Thai Nguyen University of Agriculture and Forestry
 Faculty of Agriculture and Forestry, Dalat University
 Faculty of Agriculture, Phu Yen University
 Bac Giang University of Agriculture and Forestry
 Faculty of Agriculture, Forestry and Fish, Vinh University
 Faculty of Agriculture, Forestry and Fish, Nghe An Economic University

Australia

Australia 

 Charles Sturt University
 Curtin University
 La Trobe University
 University of Melbourne Faculty of Veterinary and Agricultural Sciences
 University of New England
 University of Sydney
 University of Western Australia
 Western Sydney University
 Murdoch University
 University of Adelaide
 University of Queensland
 University of Tasmania
 Central Queensland University
University of Newcastle
Private
 Australian College of Agriculture & Horticulture (ACAH), Victoria & Queensland
 Marcus Oldham College

New Zealand 
 Lincoln University
 Massey University
 University of Waikato
 University of Otago

Central/ South America and Caribbean

Argentina 
 National University of La Plata
 National University of Córdoba
 National University of Rosario
 Pontifical Catholic University of Argentina
 University of Buenos Aires
 National University of Lujan
National University of Cuyo

Brazil 
 Universidade de São Paulo in Piracicaba, São Paulo
 Universidade Estadual de Santa Catarina, in Lages, Santa Catarina
 Universidade Estadual do Norte Fluminense, in Campos dos Goytacazes, Rio de Janeiro
 Universidade Estadual Paulista "Júlio de Mesquita Filho" in Botucatu, São Paulo
 Universidade Estadual Paulista "Júlio de Mesquita Filho" in Dracena, São Paulo
 Universidade Estadual Paulista "Júlio de Mesquita Filho" in Ilha Solteira, São Paulo
 Universidade Estadual Paulista "Júlio de Mesquita Filho" in Jaboticabal, São Paulo
 Universidade Estadual Paulista "Júlio de Mesquita Filho" in Registro, São Paulo
 Universidade Federal de Mato Grosso in Cuiabá, Mato Grosso
 Universidade Federal de Lavras in Lavras, Minas Gerais
 Universidade Federal de Minas Gerais in Montes Claros, Minas Gerais
 Universidade Federal de Pelotas, in Pelotas, Rio Grande do Sul
 Universidade Federal de Santa Catarina, in Florianópolis, Santa Catarina
 Universidade Federal de Santa Maria, in Santa Maria, Rio Grande do Sul
 Universidade Federal de São Carlos, in Araras, São Paulo
Universidade Federal de Viçosa in Florestal, Minas Gerais 
Universidade Federal de Viçosa in Rio Paranaíba, Minas Gerais
Universidade Federal de Viçosa in Viçosa, Minas Gerais
 Universidade Federal do Paraná in Curitiba, Paraná
 Universidade Federal do Rio Grande do Norte, EAJ in Macaíba, Rio Grande do Norte
 Universidade Federal do Rio Grande do Sul, in Porto Alegre, Rio Grande do Sul
 Universidade Federal do Semi Árido in Mossoró, Rio Grande do Norte
 Universidade Federal Rural do Rio de Janeiro in Seropédica, Rio de Janeiro
 Universidade Federal Rural de Pernambuco in Recife, Pernambuco
 Universidade Federal do Tocantins in Gurupi, Tocantins

Colombia 
 Universidad de los Llanos https://www.unillanos.edu.co/
 Universidad del Tolima
 Universidad Nacional de Colombia sede Bogotá, Palmira 
 Universidad de Antioquia in Medellín, Antioquia
 Universidad Santa Rosa de Cabal (UNISARC; also known as Universidad Rural y Agropecuaria de Colombia), Santa Rosa de Cabal, Risaralda
 University of Applied and Environmental Sciences

Costa Rica 
 Costa Rica Institute of Technology (TEC)
 EARTH University
 National University of Costa Rica (UNA)
 Tropical Agricultural Research and Higher Education Center (CATIE)
 University of Costa Rica, Agronomy School (UCR)

Dominican Republic 
 Instituto Politécnico Loyola – IPL, San Cristóbal
 Universidad ISA, Santiago
 Instituto Tecnológico de Cotuí – ITECO
 Instituto Tecnológico San Ignacio de Loyola – ITESIL, Dajabón
 Universidad Autónoma de Santo Domingo – UASD, Santo Domingo
 Universidad Católica Tecnológica del Cibao – UCATECI, La Vega
 Universidad Nacional Pedro Henríquez Ureña – UNPHU, Santo Domingo

Honduras 
 Zamorano Pan-American Agricultural School

Jamaica 
College of Agriculture, Science, & Education, Port Antonio

Nicaragua 
 National Agricultural University, Managua

Perú 

 National Agrarian University
 National Saint Louis Gonzaga University

Puerto Rico 
 College of Agriculture, University of Puerto Rico at Mayagüez

Europe

Austria 
University of Natural Resources and Life Sciences, Vienna

Belarus 
 Belarusian State University of Agricultural Technology, Minsk
 Belarusian State Academy of Agriculture, Horki
 Grodno State Agrarian University, Grodno

Belgium 

Gembloux Agro-Bio Tech, University of Liège, Gembloux
 Faculty of Bioscience engineering, University of Louvain, Louvain-la-Neuve
Faculty of Bioscience engineering, Ghent University, Ghent
Haute école provinciale de Hainaut Condorcet, ath agronomie.

Bulgaria 
 Trakia University, Agricultural Faculty, Stara Zagora
 Agricultural University of Plovdiv, Plovdiv
 University of Forestry, Sofia
 Technical University of Varna, Plant Production Faculty
 Institute of Agricultural Economics, Agricultural Academy, Sofia

Croatia 
 University of Zagreb, Faculty of Agriculture, Faculty of Forestry
 J. J. Strossmayer University of Osijek, Faculty of Agriculture in Osijek
 University of Zadar, Department of Ecology, Agronomy and Aquaculture,

Czech Republic 
 Czech University of Life Sciences Prague
 Mendel University Brno

Denmark 
 Aarhus University
 Royal Veterinary and Agricultural University (1856–2007)
 University of Copenhagen (2007–)

Estonia 
 Estonian University of Life Sciences
 University of Tartu

Finland 
 School of Agriculture and Forestry, Seinäjoki University of Applied Sciences
 Faculty of Agriculture and Forestry, University of Helsinki
 School of Agriculture and Forestry, (HAMK University of applied Sciences)
 School of Agriculture Savonia University of applied sciences
 Institute of Bioeconomy, JAMK University of Applied Sciences

France 
 ISTOM, École d'agronomie à Angers
AgroParisTech (also named Institut des sciences et industries du vivant et de l'environnement), Paris
 École nationale supérieure agronomique de Montpellier or Montpellier SupAgro, Montpellier
 ISA Lille, formerly the Institut Supérieur d'Agriculture de Lille
 École d'ingénieurs de Purpan, or Purpan Toulouse
 Institut Polytechnique Lasalle Beauvais, Beauvais
 École nationale supérieure d'agronomie et des industries alimentaires, Vandoeuvre-lès-Nancy
 Institut national supérieur des sciences agronomiques, de l'alimentation et de l'environnement  or Agrosup Dijon, Dijon
 Agrocampus Ouest, Rennes and Angers 
 École nationale supérieure des sciences agronomiques de Bordeaux Aquitaine  or Bordeaux Sciences Agro, Bordeaux
 Institut national d'enseignement supérieur et de recherche en alimentation, santé animale, sciences agronomiques et de l'environnement  or VetAgro Sup, Clermont-Ferrand
 Nantes-Atlantic National College of Veterinary Medicine, Food Science and Engineering (in French, École nationale vétérinaire, agroalimentaire et de l'alimentation, Nantes-Atlantique)  or Oniris, Nantes
 École Nationale Supérieure Agronomique de Toulouse, Toulouse
 Université de technologie de Compiègne, Compiègnes

Germany 
 Christian-Albrechts-Universität zu Kiel
 Friedrich-Wilhelms-Universität Bonn
 Georg-August-Universität Göttingen
 Justus-Liebig-Universität Gießen
 Landwirtschaftlich-Gärtnerische Fakultät, Humboldt Universität, Berlin (formerly Agricultural University of Berlin)
 Leibniz University Hannover
 Martin-Luther-Universität Halle-Wittenberg
 Technische Universität München
 Universität Hohenheim
 Universität Kassel
 Universität Rostock

Greece 
 Agricultural University of Athens
 Faculty of Agriculture, Forestry and Natural Environment, Aristotle University of Thessaloniki
 Perrotis College at the American Farm School of Thessaloniki
School of Agricultural Sciences and Forestry, Democritus University of Thrace
 School of Agricultural Sciences, University of Thessaly
 Technological Educational Institute of Crete
 Technological Educational Institute of Epirus
 Technological Educational Institute of Kalamata
 Technological Educational Institute of Kavala
 Technological Educational Institute of Larissa
 Technological Educational Institute of Messolonghi
 Alexander Technological Educational Institute of Thessaloniki
 Technological Educational Institute of West Macedonia

Hungary 
 University of Debrecen, Debrecen
 Kaposvár University, Kaposvár
 Pannon University, Keszthely
 Szent István University, Gödöllő, and Budapest (Budai Campus)
 Széchenyi István University  Faculty of Agricultural and Food Science, Mosonmagyaróvár
 University of Szeged Faculty of Engineering, Szeged
 Neumann János University Faculty of Horticulture and Rural development, Kecskemét
 Eszterházy Károly University  Faculty of Agriculture and Rural development, Gyöngyös

Iceland 
 Agricultural University of Iceland, Hvanneyri

Ireland 
 Gurteen College, Ballingarry, Roscrea, North Tipperary
 Mountbellew Agricultural College (formerly Franciscan Brothers Agricultural College), Mountbellew, Co. Galway
 University College Dublin, Dublin

Italy 
 Università degli studi di Milano, Agraria, Milan
 University of Naples Federico II, Agraria, Naples
 Alma Mater Studiorum, Agraria, Bologna
 Università degli Studi, Scienze Agrarie, Perugia
 Scienze e Technologie Agrarie, Università Di Padova
 Università degli Studi di Firenze, Scuola di Agraria, Florence

Latvia 
 Latvia University of Life Sciences and Technologies (formerly Latvia University of Agriculture)

Lithuania 
 Aleksandras Stulginskis University

North Macedonia 
 Faculty of Agricultural Science and Food, Ss. Cyril and Methodius University of Skopje

Moldova 
 Agricultural State University of Moldova

The Netherlands 
 Wageningen University and Research Centre

 HAS University of Applied Sciences
 Van Hall Larenstein
 Inholland University of Applied Sciences

Norway 
 Norwegian University of Life Sciences

Poland 
 University of Life Sciences in Lublin (Uniwersytet Przyrodniczy w Lublinie) 
 West Pomeranian University of Technology, Szczecin (Zachodniopomorski Uniwersytet Technologiczny w Szczecinie)
 Agricultural University of Kraków (Uniwersytet Rolniczy w Krakowie) 
 University of Life Sciences in Poznań (Uniwersytet Przyrodniczy w Poznaniu)
 Siedlce University of Natural Sciences and Humanities(Uniwersytet Przyrodniczo-Humanistyczny w Siedlcach) 
 University of Technology and Life Sciences in Bydgoszcz (Uniwersytet Technologiczno-Przyrodniczy w Bydgoszczy, UTP)
 Warsaw University of Life Sciences (Szkoła Główna Gospodarstwa Wiejskiego)
 Wroclaw University of Environmental and Life Sciences (Uniwersytet Przyrodniczy we Wrocławiu)
  Faculty of Biology and Agriculture  ( Wydział Biologiczno-Rolniczy – Uniwersytet Rzeszowski ) Rzeszów University
 Faculty of Environmental Management & Agriculture University of Warmia and Mazury in Olsztyn (Wydział Kształtowania Środowiska i Rolnictwa – Uniwersytet Warmińsko-Mazurski w Olsztynie)

Portugal 
 Agrarian School of Beja, Polytechnic Institute of Beja
 Agrarian School of Bragança, Polytechnic Institute of Bragança
 Agrarian School of Castelo Branco, Polytechnic Institute of Castelo Branco
 Agrarian School of Coimbra, Polytechnic Institute of Coimbra
 Agrarian School of Elvas, Polytechnic Institute of Portalegre
 Agrarian School of Santarém, Polytechnic Institute of Santarém
 Agrarian School of Ponte de Lima, Polytechnic Institute of Viana do Castelo
 Agrarian School of Viseu, Polytechnic Institute of Viseu
 Faculty of Science and Technology, University of the Algarve
 Instituto Superior de Agronomia, University of Lisbon
 School of Sciences and Technology, University of Évora
 School of Agrarian and Veterinary Sciences, University of Trás-os-Montes and Alto Douro

Romania 
 University of Galati, Galati
 Banat University of Agricultural Sciences and Veterinary Medicine, Timișoara
 Ion Ionescu de la Brad University of Agricultural Sciences and Veterinary Medicine of Iași
 University of Agricultural Sciences and Veterinary Medicine of Cluj-Napoca
 University of Agronomic Sciences and Veterinary Medicine, Bucharest

Russian Federation 
 Moscow Agricultural Academy
 Kazan State Agrarian University
 Ural State Agricultural Academy
 Ural State Academy of Veterinary Medicine
 Moscow State Academy of Veterinary Medicine and Biotechnology
 Chelyabinsk State Agricultural Engineering Academy
 Perm State Agricultural Academy
 Izhevsk State Agricultural Academy
 Kuban State Agrarian University
 Don State Agrarian University
 Far Eastern State Agrarian University
 Orenburg State Agrarian University
 Ryazan State Agrotechnological University
 Michurinsk State Agrarian University
 Far Eastern State Technical Fishing University
 Omsk State Agrarian University
 Stavropol State Agrarian University
 Saint Petersburg State Agrarian University
 Saratov State Agrarian University
 Voronezh State Agrarian University
 Tver State Agricultural Academy
 Yaroslavl State Agricultural Academy
 Yakutsk State Agricultural Academy
 Dagestan State Agricultural Academy
 Kurgan State Agricultural Academy
 Vyatka State Agricultural Academy
 Belgorod State Agricultural University
 Penza State Agrarian University

Serbia 
 University of Belgrade
 Faculty of Agriculture
 Faculty of Forestry
 University of Novi Sad
 Faculty of Agriculture

Slovakia 
Slovak University of Agriculture, Nitra

Slovenia 
 Faculty of Agriculture and Life Sciences, :sl:Maribor
 Biotechnical faculty :sl:Ljubljana
 Agricultural institute of Slovenia :sl:Ljubljana

Spain 
 Faculty of Agriculture, University of Almería
 Faculty of Agriculture, University of Seville
 School of Agrifood and Forestry Science and Engineering (ETSEA), University of Lleida
 School of Agricultural, Food and Biosystems Engineering (ETSIAAB) Polytechnic University of Madrid
 Escola Superior d'Agricultura de Barcelona, Universitat Politecnica de Catalunya

Sweden 
 Swedish University of Agricultural Sciences

Switzerland 
ETH Zurich
School of Agricultural, Forest and Food Sciences HAFL

Turkey 
Konya Food and Agriculture University

Ukraine 
 Mykolaiv National Agrarian University
 Tavria State Agrotechnological University
 National University of Life and Environmental Sciences of Ukraine
 Uman National University of Horticulture
Sumy National Agrarian University
Kharkiv National Agrarian University named after V.V. Dokuchayev

United Kingdom 
 Aberystwyth University IBERS
 Askham Bryan College
 Berkshire College of Agriculture
 Bicton College
 Brooksby Agricultural College (Melton Mowbray)
 Capel Manor College
 Clinterty Agricultural College
 College of Agriculture, Food and Rural Enterprise, Northern Ireland (CAFRE)
 Downton Agricultural College
 Easton & Otley College
 Hadlow College
 Harper Adams University
 Hartpury College (an associate faculty of the University of the West of England)
 Kingston Maurward College
 Lackham College (part of Wiltshire College)
 Moulton College
 Myerscough College
 Newton Rigg College (part of Askham Bryan College)
 Oaklands College
 Plumpton College
 Reaseheath College
 Rodbaston College (part of South Staffordshire College)
 Royal Agricultural University, Cirencester
 Scotland's Rural College (SRUC; formerly Scottish Agricultural College)
 Shuttleworth College (part of Bedford College)
 Sparsholt College Hampshire
 University of Nottingham
 University of Reading
 Writtle College

North America

Canada

British Columbia 

 Centre for Agriculture Excellence, University of the Fraser Valley in Chilliwack, British Columbia
 Sustainable Agriculture & Food Systems, Kwantlen Polytechnic University in Richmond, British Columbia
 Faculty of Land and Food Systems, University of British Columbia in Vancouver, British Columbia

Alberta 

 Grande Prairie Regional College in Grande Prairie, Alberta
 Lakeland College in Vermilion, Alberta
 Olds College in Olds, Alberta
 Red Deer College in Red Deer, Alberta
 Department of Agriculture, Food & Nutritional Science, University of Alberta in Edmonton, Alberta
Centre for Technology, Environment and Design. Lethbridge College, Lethbridge, Alberta

Saskatchewan 

 Carlton Trail Regional College in Humboldt, Saskatchewan
 Cypress Hills College in Swift Current, Saskatchewan
 College of Agriculture and Bioresources at University of Saskatchewan in Saskatoon, Saskatchewan

Manitoba 

 Assiniboine Community College in Brandon, Manitoba
 Faculty of Agricultural and Food Sciences, University of Manitoba in Winnipeg, Manitoba

Ontario 

 Ontario Agricultural College, University of Guelph in Guelph, Ontario
 Ridgetown College, Ontario Agricultural College in Ridgetown, Ontario
 Algonquin College, in Perth, Ontario
 Collège D'Alfred , Ontario Agricultural College in Alfred, Ontario

Québec 

 Institut de technologie agroalimentaire  in La Pocatière, Quebec and Saint-Hyacinthe, Quebec
 Faculté des sciences de l'agriculture et de l'alimentation, Université Laval in Ville de Québec, Québec
 Macdonald Campus, McGill University in Montreal, Québec

Nova Scotia 

 Faculty of Agriculture at Dalhousie University, Bible Hill, Nova Scotia

Mexico 
 Universidad Autónoma Chapingo
 Universidad Autónoma Agraria Antonio Narro
 Universidad Autónoma de Guadalajara
 Universidad de Guadalajara
 Universidad Juárez Autónoma de Tabasco
 Universidad Autónoma de Baja California

United States 

 Abraham Baldwin Agricultural College
 Alabama Agricultural and Mechanical University
 Alcorn State University
 Arizona State University
 Arkansas State University
 Auburn University
 Angelo State University
 California Polytechnic State University
 California State Polytechnic University, Pomona
 California State University Chico (Chico State)
 California State University Fresno (Fresno State)
 Clemson University
 Colorado State University
 Cornell University College of Agriculture and Life Sciences
 Delaware Valley University
 Eastern Kentucky University
 Florida A&M University
 Fort Hays State University
 Fort Valley State University
 Iowa State University
 Kansas State University College of Agriculture
 Louisiana State University
 Michigan State University
 Mississippi State University
 Missouri State University
 Montana State University
 Morehead State University
 Murray State University
 Nebraska College of Technical Agriculture
 New Mexico State University
 North Carolina Agricultural and Technical State University
 North Carolina State University College of Agriculture and Life Sciences
 North Dakota State University
 Ohio State University
 Oklahoma State University
 Oregon State University
 Penn State University College of Agricultural Sciences
 Purdue University
 Rutgers University, School of Environmental and Biological Sciences
 South Dakota State University
 Southern Arkansas University
 Southern Illinois University 
 Southern University and A&M College, Baton Rouge, Louisiana
 State University of New York at Cobleskill College of Agriculture and Technology, Cobleskill, NY
 Sterling College Rian Fried Center for Sustainable Agriculture & Food Systems, Craftsbury Common, VT
 Stockbridge School of Agriculture
 Texas A&M University
 Texas Tech University
 UIUC College of Agriculture, Consumer, and Environmental Sciences
 University of Alaska Fairbanks
 University of Arizona, College of Agriculture and Life Sciences
 University of Arkansas, Dale Bumpers College of Agricultural, Food and Life Sciences
 University of California, Davis
 University of California, Riverside
 University of California, Santa Cruz
 University of Connecticut
 University of Delaware
 University of Florida College of Agricultural and Life Sciences
 University of Georgia College of Agricultural and Environmental Sciences
 University of Hawaii at Manoa
 University of Idaho
 University of Kentucky College of Agriculture
 University of Maine
 University of Maryland, College Park
 University of Maryland, Eastern Shore
 University of Massachusetts Amherst
 University of Minnesota College of Food, Agricultural and Natural Resource Sciences
 University of Missouri
 University of Nebraska, Lincoln
 University of Nevada, Reno
 University of Rhode Island College of the Environment and Life Sciences
 University of Wisconsin–Madison
 University of Wisconsin–River Falls
 University of Wyoming
 Utah State University
 Virginia Polytechnic Institute and State University
 Washington State University
 Western Kentucky University
 West Virginia State University
 West Virginia University

See also 

 List of colleges of natural resources
 List of forestry universities and colleges

References 

 
Lists of universities and colleges